opened in Sapporo, Hokkaidō, Japan in 1991. Its aim is to research, collect, provide expertise on the preservation of, and display the city's buried cultural properties. The collection includes Jōmon artefacts as well as those of the Satsumon culture excavated from the Sapporo City K-446 Site that have been designated a Prefectural Tangible Cultural Property.

See also
 Hokkaido Archaeological Operations Center
 Hokkaido Museum
 List of Cultural Properties of Japan - archaeological materials (Hokkaidō)
 List of Cultural Properties of Japan - historical materials (Hokkaidō)
 List of Historic Sites of Japan (Hokkaidō)

References

External links
  Sappporo Buried Cultural Property Center

Museums in Sapporo
Archaeological museums in Japan
History of Sapporo
Museums established in 1991
1991 establishments in Japan